Jafarabad (also Romanized as Ja‘farābād) is a village in Cheraghabad Rural District, Tukahur District, Minab County, Hormozgan Province, Iran. At the 2006 census, its population was 596, in 116 families.

References 

Populated places in Minab County